Jay Kennedy Harris (born 21 March 1995) is a former Australian rules footballer best known for his playing career with the Melbourne Football Club in the Australian Football League (AFL). He entered top-level football early when he played for the Oakleigh Chargers in the TAC Cup as a bottom-aged player, in addition to representing Vic Metro in the 2013 AFL Under 18 Championships. His achievements as a junior include being the first indigenous player to captain a TAC Cup side and he was named in the TAC Cup team of the year. He was recruited by the Melbourne Football Club with the fortieth overall selection in the 2013 AFL draft and made his debut in the 2014 season.

Kennedy Harris was delisted by Melbourne shortly after the completion of the 2019 AFL season.

Early life
Kennedy Harris was born to Heather Kennedy and Edgar Harris and grew up in Endeavour Hills, Victoria attending St John's Regional College before moving to Trinity Grammar for year nine in 2009 as a boarder. He was encouraged by schoolmate and eventual  player, Luke McDonald to join the Kew Comets Junior Football Club before he joined the Oakleigh Chargers in the TAC Cup as a bottom-aged player in 2012 where he was a part of their premiership winning side. After graduating from school in 2012 and commencing a science degree at the University of Melbourne in 2013, he entered his draft year as the co-captain of the Oakleigh Chargers, becoming the first indigenous player to captain a TAC Cup side. He played twelve matches for the season and was named on the interchange bench in the TAC Cup team of the year. He received mid-year state honours when he represented Vic Metro at the 2013 AFL Under 18 Championships. After his performances in the TAC Cup and under 18 championships where he played as both a small forward and midfielder, he was compared to  small forward, Jake Neade and then- player, Mathew Stokes, and it was predicted he would be drafted inside the top thirty in the 2013 AFL draft.

AFL career

Kennedy Harris was drafted by the Melbourne Football Club with their second selection and fortieth overall in the 2013 national draft. His first match in Melbourne colours was in Melbourne's first match of the 2014 NAB Challenge against  at Etihad Stadium, he kicked three final quarter goals to secure Melbourne an unexpected victory. He was praised during the match by AFL Media journalist, Jennifer Phelan, by stating he "demanded attention every time he went near the ball with his speed, courage and creativity." His performances in the pre-season earned him a round one debut in the seventeen point loss against  at Etihad Stadium. He played the first eleven matches for the season before he was omitted for the round thirteen match against  at the Melbourne Cricket Ground. He spent the next month in the Victorian Football League (VFL) for Melbourne's affiliate team, the Casey Scorpions, before being recalled to the senior side for the three point loss against  at Adelaide Oval in round eighteen. He played the next two matches before being dropped for the round twenty-one match against  at the Melbourne Cricket Ground, and missed the remainder of the season. He managed fourteen games in his debut season — starting as the substitute in six games — and kicked nine goals.

On the eve of the 2015 season, Kennedy Harris signed a two-year contract extension, tying him to the club until the end of the 2017 season, and played for the Indigenous All-Stars in the nine point loss against  at Leederville Oval. After the recruitment of  small forward, Jeff Garlett, Kennedy Harris struggled to maintain a spot in the senior side. He played in the opening round win against  at the Melbourne Cricket Ground, before he was omitted for the round two match against  at StarTrack Oval. He returned the next week for the twenty-five point loss against  at Adelaide Oval, replacing the injured Jack Viney. He played every match until the round seven match against  at the Melbourne Cricket Ground due to a groin injury. He missed the next month of football, before returning from injury through the VFL Development League. He played three AFL matches in the second half of the season to finish with eight matches in total.

The 2016 season saw Kennedy Harris suffer from a hamstring injury on three separate occasions, he first injured it during the pre-season and the second time during the opening match of the VFL season against  at Casey Fields. He returned to play in the VFL in June, before he was ruled out for the next four to six weeks when he injured his hamstring for the third time during the season. He managed to return to the VFL for the end of the season, playing four matches in August. His injury interrupted season meant he did not play a senior AFL match for the year.

Statistics
Statistics are correct to the end of the 2019 season

|- style="background-color: #EAEAEA"
! scope="row" style="text-align:center" | 2014
|
| 24 || 14 || 9 || 6 || 75 || 65 || 140 || 30 || 27 || 0.6 || 0.4 || 5.4 || 4.6 || 10.0 || 2.1 || 1.9
|- 
! scope="row" style="text-align:center" | 2015
|
| 24 || 8 || 2 || 3 || 40 || 33 || 73 || 22 || 14 || 0.3 || 0.4 || 5.0 || 4.1 || 9.1 || 2.8 || 1.8
|- style="background-color: #EAEAEA"
! scope="row" style="text-align:center" | 2016
|
| 24 || 0 || — || — || — || — || — || — || — || — || — || — || — || — || — || —
|- 
! scope="row" style="text-align:center" | 2017
|
| 24 || 6 || 0 || 1 || 45 || 51 || 96 || 18 || 23 || 0.0 || 0.2 || 7.5 || 8.5 || 16.0 || 3.0 || 3.8
|- style="background-color: #EAEAEA"
! scope="row" style="text-align:center" | 2018
|
| 24 || 6 || 1 || 4 || 42 || 46 || 88 || 17 || 28 || 0.2 || 0.7 || 7.0 || 7.7 || 14.7 || 2.8 || 4.7
|- 
! scope="row" style="text-align:center" | 2019
|
| 24 || 5 || 0 || 0 || 48 || 37 || 85 || 23 || 11 || 0.0 || 0.0 || 9.6 || 7.4 || 17.0 || 4.6 || 2.2
|- class="sortbottom"
! colspan=3| Career
! 39
! 12
! 14
! 250
! 232
! 482
! 110
! 103
! 0.3
! 0.4
! 6.4
! 5.9
! 12.4
! 2.8
! 2.6
|}

Acting

Before being recruited into the AFL, Kennedy Harris had a regular role in the 2010 ABC 1 TV show, Dead Gorgeous, starring in all 13 episodes as Charlie. He has also been in an episode of Neighbours, credited as Cub Scout No. 2, and was in the film, Blessed, as Young Jimmy. Kennedy Harris was also in a protective services officers recruitment campaign commercial by Victoria Police.

Filmography

References

External links

Jay Kennedy Harris' profile from Demonwiki

1995 births
Living people
Oakleigh Chargers players
Australian rules footballers from Melbourne
Melbourne Football Club players
Casey Demons players
People educated at Trinity Grammar School, Kew
University of Melbourne alumni
Indigenous Australian players of Australian rules football
Australian male television actors
People from the City of Casey